The UNESCO (United Nations Educational, Scientific and Cultural Organization) has designated 61 World Heritage Sites in six countries (also called "state parties") of Southern Asia: Afghanistan, India, Nepal, Pakistan, Sri Lanka and Bangladesh. Bhutan and Maldives, which are also located within the region, do not have any World Heritage Sites.

In this region, India is home to the most inscribed sites (fifth globally) with 40 sites. Besides India, the first sites from the Country Nepal were the Sagarmatha National Park and Kathmandu Valley. Nepal has a total of four sites. Sri Lanka has eight sites and Bangladesh has three sites. Pakistan has six sites. Two sites are located in Afghanistan, both of which are enlisted as endangered. Each year, UNESCO's World Heritage Committee may inscribe new sites on the list or delist sites that no longer meet the criteria. Selection is based on ten criteria: six for cultural heritage (i–vi) and four for natural heritage (vii–x). Some sites, designated "mixed sites," represent both cultural and natural heritage. In Southern Asia, there are 48 cultural, 12 natural, and 1 mixed site.

The World Heritage Committee may also specify that a site is endangered, citing "conditions which threaten the very characteristics for which a property was inscribed on the World Heritage List." Two sites in this region are currently listed as endangered.

Legend

Site; named after the World Heritage Committee's official designation
Location; at city, regional, or provincial level and geocoordinates
Criteria; as defined by the World Heritage Committee
Area; in hectares and acres. If available, the size of the buffer zone has been noted as well. A value of zero implies that no data has been published by UNESCO
Year; during which the site was inscribed to the World Heritage List
Description; brief information about the site, including reasons for qualifying as an endangered site, if applicable

World Heritage Sites

UNESCO sites for South Asia compared to other Asian regions
The number of UNESCO sites of South Asia is contrasted by the number of sites Southeast and East Asia. South Asian countries are noted with 'SA'.

See also
List of World Heritage Sites in Afghanistan
List of World Heritage Sites in Bangladesh
List of World Heritage Sites in India
List of World Heritage Sites in Nepal
List of World Heritage Sites in Pakistan
List of World Heritage Sites in Sri Lanka

Notes

References
General

Notes

Asia, Southern